Karl-Erik "Cacka" Israelsson (23 August 1929 – 10 January 2013) was a Swedish long jumper, who won the national title in 1951 and finished seventh at the 1952 Summer Olympics. He was also a notable singer-songwriter in the country music style and an occasional actor.

References

1929 births
2013 deaths
Swedish male long jumpers
Swedish country singers
Olympic athletes of Sweden
Athletes (track and field) at the 1952 Summer Olympics
20th-century Swedish people
Sportspeople from Stockholm
Singers from Stockholm